Konnarock Training School, also known as Konnarock Lutheran Girls School, is a historic school complex located at Konnarock, Smyth County, Virginia. The main building was built in 1925, and is a -story, 14 bay, hipped roof, Rustic style wood-frame building. It is sheathed in bark shingles and has an attached rear chapel.  Also on the property are an American Craftsman-style chestnut bark-shingled bungalow (1936) originally used as the school's Health Center, a collapsed two-car garage, an arbor and a farm complex.  The property was original developed by the Lutheran church as a mission to the southern Appalachians.  The school closed in 1958, and was later acquired by the Forest Service.

It was listed on the National Register of Historic Places in 1997.

References

External links
A Brief History of the Konnarock Training School

School buildings on the National Register of Historic Places in Virginia
School buildings completed in 1925
Schools in Smyth County, Virginia
National Register of Historic Places in Smyth County, Virginia
1925 establishments in Virginia